Hassan Dardir (November 13, 1938 – April 29, 2021) was a Saudi Arabian actor.

Works

Plays 
I am your brother Amin (1967)

Series TV 
Surprises in hotel (1971)
Wonders architecture in Tunisia (1969)
Songs in a sea aspirations (1969)

Movies 
Remorse (1966)

References

1938 births
2021 deaths
Saudi Arabian male actors
Saudi Arabian male television actors
Saudi Arabian male film actors
Saudi Arabian male stage actors
People from Jeddah